The Field Army Bernolák was a field army of the Axis Slovak Republic during World War II. It was named after Anton Bernolák, the first codifier of the literary Slovak language.

The Slovak 1st Infantry Division "Janošík" took part in the Slovak invasion of Poland in September 1939. In October it returned to Slovakia and was upgraded to a fully motorized division. Another component, the Fast Troops Group Kalinčiak, took part in Operation Barbarossa in 1941, advancing under Army Group South.

In August 1943 the Fast Division was restructured and renamed the 1st Infantry Division. However, the 1st Infantry Division saw very little action and was used for rear area duties until it was disbanded in July 1944 to form construction units.

Order of Battle
The army's order of battle between 1939 and 1944 was as follows:

Army Commander: General Ferdinand Čatloš
 Slovak 1st Infantry Division "Janošík"
 Gen. Antonin Pulanich
 Slovak 2nd Infantry Division "Škultéty"
 Col. Ivan Imro, later Gen. Alexandr Čunderlik
 Slovak 3rd Infantry Division "Razus"
 Gen. Augustín Malár
 Fast Troops Group "Kalinčiak"
 Col. Ivan Imro

References
Ready, J. Lee. London: Arms and Armour Press, 1995.

Military history of Slovakia during World War II
Infantry divisions of World War II
Military history of Poland during World War II
Military units and formations established in 1939
Military units and formations disestablished in 1944